Tampa Palms is a neighborhood within the New Tampa district of the city of Tampa, Florida. As of the 2010 census the neighborhood had a population of 13,515. The ZIP Codes serving the neighborhood are 33559, 33592, 33613, 33617, 33637, and 33647.

Description
Tampa Palms is an exclusive mix-use planned community north of USF along the Bruce B Downs corridor. Tampa Palms is complete with homes, shops, offices, churches, recreational facilities, schools and dining facilities. Designed by engineering team of Post, Buckley, Schuh & Jernigan, Tampa Palms has been awarded the coveted Aurora Award by the Southeast Homebuilders Association and was named "the top master planned community in the US for 1987" by the National Association of Homebuilders.

Schools in this area are Chiles Elementary, Tampa Palms Elementary, Liberty Middle, Primrose School, and Freedom High.

Geography
Tampa Palms boundaries are roughly the University of South Florida to the south, the University community to the southwest, Lutz to the west, and Interstate 75 to the east and north.

Demographics
Source: Hillsborough County Atlas

As of the census of 2000, there were 10,159 people and 4,299 households residing in the neighborhood. The population density was 1,133/mi2. The racial makeup of the neighborhood was 83% White, 8% African American, 1% Native American, 4% Asian, 2% from other races, and 2% from two or more races. Hispanic or Latino of any race were 10% of the population.

There were 4,299 households, out of which 31% had children under the age of 18 living with them, 44% were married couples living together, 8% had a female householder with no husband present, and 18% were non-families. 27% of all households were made up of individuals.

In the neighborhood the population was spread out, with 23% under the age of 18, 36% from 18 to 34, 26% from 35 to 49, 11% from 50 to 64, and 3% who were 65 years of age or older. For every 100 females, there were 102.2 males.

The per capita income for the neighborhood was $34,599. About 10% of the population were below the poverty line, 18% of those are under the age of 18.

See also
Neighborhoods in Tampa, Florida
New Tampa
Westchase

References

External links
Tampa Palms neighborhood page
Tampa Palms Homeowners Association, Inc
Tampa Palms Community Profile from Hometown Locator

Neighborhoods in Tampa, Florida
Planned communities in Florida